The Incredible Journey of Mary Bryant is a 2005 miniseries loosely based on the life of Mary Bryant, an English girl from Cornwall who in this telling was convicted of petty theft (though the historical Mary Bryant was transported for a violent robbery and assault), and who was transported to the Australian Penal Colony on the First Fleet with other prisoners bound for Botany Bay. It was written by Peter Berry and directed by Peter Andrikidis. The film had a budget in excess of 15 million, making it the largest-budget television mini-series produced in Australia.

Plot

Mary's story begins in her home, Cornwall England where her village is starving to death. In desperation, she steals, landing her a place on the long voyage to Sydney along with other convicts.

Pregnant by a jailer, Mary is befriended by a quick-witted smuggler named Will. She is also aided by another on board, a stiff-necked, moralistic British officer named Lt Ralph Clarke, whose wife abandons him just as the ships set sail. His help was portrayed as a mission in humanity and social reform.

During a rough night at sea Mary hits her head on a bar and is knocked unconscious only to be saved by Will, with whom she becomes increasingly passionate. She is also cared for by Lt Clarke. Unaware that she is “with child”, Clarke asks permission from the Captain to let Mary stay with him. He believes that by educating her, he can reform her. Clarke has promised "the girl will remain an innocent under his charge" so, after finding out that she is pregnant, Clarke takes his anger out on one of the other female convicts (who insulted him) with a lash. Angered by his heartless act, Mary returns to the cells with the other prisoners.

After giving birth to her daughter on the ship, Mary and the other convicts arrive at Botany Bay. Mary named her daughter , "after the ship". Seeing the benefits of being a family, Mary soon marries Will and they have a son Emmanuel. Her determination is always to avoid the hunger of her upbringing and to save her children from a similar fate.

Mary "abandons" her husband to live with Clarke who had been infatuated with her ever since she stayed with him on the ship. This is merely a distraction so her husband and their friends can steal food and supplies. After getting everything they need to escape in the Governor's cutter, Mary slips away from Clarke in the middle of the night. Infuriated that Mary deceived him and again deserted him, Clarke shoots at and tries to sink their boat. They escape with only minor damage to the boat.

Mary, her husband Will, their two children, and five other men set sail for Timor, closely followed by Clarke who obsessively pursues them. Through sheer grit and enormous luck, most of them make it 4,000 miles to the Dutch colony of Timor where for a time they enjoy the luxury of freedom under false identities.

However, fate conspires against them as Clarke stops there on his way back to England. The group flee Clarke and his guards, splitting up to avoid being caught. Will, realising the danger that Mary and the children are in, intentionally leads the guards away from his frightened family. Pursued by the jealous Clarke, Will is eventually shot and killed.

An intense meeting between Mary and Clarke in the tropical jungle finds Clarke holding a pistol to Mary's head. Mary again tries to manipulate the lovesick Clarke in order to save her children. Realising that she does not love him and only used him to survive, Clarke fires his pistol into the air, alerting nearby guards of their whereabouts causing Mary to be arrested.

On the journey home to England, where Mary and her two surviving escapees are imprisoned once again, she loses both of her children to shipboard diseases. An emotional Mary lets go of her son and daughter, dropping them into the open sea, as she says farewell to the rest of her family.

On arrival in England, a charismatic Mary gains the support of the English public as she retells her story of the search for justice, in which she lost her entire family. The courts decide to free Mary and her companions in appreciation of their honesty and the belief that they had learned their initial lesson. As for Clarke, he is left in England carrying the burden of being responsible for the death of Will, Charlotte, and Emmanuel. As Mary stands once again in Cornwall where her story began, she reflects on the short time of her family, and the lack of freedom symbolised through the death of her beloved. She silently agrees to carry on for the sake of their deceased souls, despite not knowing what the future holds anymore.

Cast

Crew

Awards and nominations

References

External links

The Incredible Journey of Mary Bryant at the National Film and Sound Archive
The Incredible Journey of Mary Bryant at Australian Screen Online

APRA Award winners
Australian adventure drama films
2005 television films
2005 films
2000s adventure drama films
Films set in colonial Australia
Films set in Cornwall
Television shows set in colonial Australia
2000s Australian television miniseries
2005 Australian television series debuts
2005 Australian television series endings
2005 drama films
2000s English-language films